HMS Cossack was a  destroyer named after the Cossack people of Ukrainian steppe.

Description
The Tribals were intended to counter the large destroyers being built abroad and to improve the firepower of the existing destroyer flotillas and were thus significantly larger and more heavily armed than the preceding . The destroyers were powered by two Parsons geared steam turbines, each driving one propeller shaft using steam provided by three Admiralty three-drum boilers. The ships' complement consisted of 190 officers and ratings, although the flotilla leaders carried an extra 20 officers and men consisting of the Captain (D) and his staff.

The primary armament of the Tribal-class destroyers was eight quick-firing (QF) 4.7-inch (120 mm) Mark XII guns in four superfiring twin-gun mounts, one pair each fore and aft of the superstructure, designated 'A', 'B', 'X', and 'Y' from front to rear. The mounts had a maximum elevation of 40°. For anti-aircraft (AA) defence, they carried a single quadruple mount for the  QF two-pounder Mk II "pom-pom" gun and two quadruple mounts for the 0.5-inch (12.7 mm) Mark III machine gun. Low-angle fire for the main guns was controlled by the director-control tower (DCT) on the bridge roof that fed data acquired by it and the  rangefinder on the Mk II Rangefinder/Director directly aft of the DCT to an analogue mechanical computer, the Mk I Admiralty Fire Control Clock. Anti-aircraft fire for the main guns was controlled by the Rangefinder/Director which sent data to the mechanical Fuze Keeping Clock.

The ships were fitted with a single above-water quadruple mount for  torpedoes. The Tribals were not intended as anti-submarine ships, but they were provided with ASDIC, one depth charge rack and two throwers for self-defence, although the throwers were not mounted in all ships; Twenty depth charges was the peacetime allotment, but this increased to 30 during wartime.

Wartime modifications
Heavy losses to German air attack during the Norwegian Campaign  demonstrated the ineffectiveness of the Tribals' anti-aircraft suite and the RN decided in May 1940 to replace 'X' mount with two QF  Mark XVI dual-purpose guns in a twin-gun mount. To better control the guns, the existing rangefinder/director was modified to accept a Type 285 gunnery radar as they became available. The number of depth charges was increased to 46 early in the war, and still more were added later. To increase the firing arcs of the AA guns, the rear funnel was shortened and the mainmast was reduced to a short pole mast.

Construction and career 

Authorized as one of nine Tribal-class destroyers under the 1936 Naval Estimates, Cossack was the sixth ship of her name to serve in the Royal Navy. The ship was ordered on 19 June 1936 from Vickers-Armstrongs and was laid down on 9 June at the company's High Walker, Newcastle upon Tyne, shipyard. Launched on 8 June 1937, Cossack was completed on 10 June 1938 and commissioned four days later at a cost of £341,082 which excluded weapons and communications outfits furnished by the Admiralty.

On 7 November 1939 Cossack collided with SS Borthwick in the Firth of Forth en route from Scapa Flow to Leith Docks. Several people were injured and at least five were killed, being buried in Seafield Cemetery in north Edinburgh.

Altmark incident
[[File:HMS-Cossack-returns-to-Leith-17-February-1940.jpg|thumb|Cossack returns to Leith on 17 February 1940, after rescuing the British prisoners held in [[German cruiser Admiral Graf Spee|Graf Spee'''s]] supply ship ]]Cossacks first action was on 16 February 1940, under the command of Philip Vian. This was the Altmark Incident in Jøssingfjord, Norway which resulted in the freeing of the Admiral Graf Spees prisoners, who were being held aboard the supply ship , and the death of eight crew members of the German ship.

In the incident the German tanker rammed her with the stern at an angle of about 30° at the level of her bridge and drove the destroyer towards the fjord wall. The Norwegian officers present later reported that only the mass of ice piled up prevented the destroyer being crushed onto the rocky shore. The powerful engines of the destroyer made her escape from the squeeze possible. Cossack arrived at Leith on 17 February with the 299 freed prisoners. She had to be docked for her propeller and A-brackets to be checked in case they had been damaged by the fjord's thick ice. They were unharmed, but her stern plating had to be repaired where it had been bumping against Altmark.

The Norwegian government subsequently protested at Cossacks breach of Norway's neutrality and demanded the return of the British prisoners of war; the German government also protested that the incident had been a violation of international law.

Second Battle of NarvikCossack participated in the Second Battle of Narvik in April 1940. Later that year, she was part of the force which was assigned to hunt for a German surface raider that had been reported breaking out into the North Atlantic. The report turned out to be false, so after spending a week at sea, including Christmas Day, she returned to port on New Year's Eve.

Chasing Bismarck
While escorting Convoy WS-8B to the Middle East, Cossack and four other destroyers broke off on 26 May, and headed towards the area where Bismarck had been reported. They found Bismarck that evening and made several torpedo attacks in the evening and into the next morning. No hits were scored, but they kept the Bismarck's gunners from getting any sleep, making it easier for the battleships to attack the Bismarck the next morning. During the battle one of Bismarck's shells sheared off Cossack's antenna.

Loss
On 23 October 1941 Cossack was escorting a convoy from Gibraltar to the United Kingdom when she was struck by a single torpedo fired by the German submarine  commanded by Klaus Bargsten. She was taken in tow by a tug from Gibraltar on 25 October but the weather worsened and the tow was slipped on 26 October. Cossack sank in the Atlantic west of Gibraltar on 27 October 1941. 159 of her crew were lost. However, purportedly, the Ship's cat, Oskar, survived. Oskar also survived the sinking of Bismarck and would go on to survive the sinking of HMS Ark Royal after she was torpedoed in November 1941. 

Notes

 References 
 
 
 
 
 
 
 

 
 
 R. K. Lochner: Als das Eis brach: Der Krieg zur See um Norwegen 1940.'' Heyne Verlag, München 1983.

External links

The HMS Cossack Association 

 

Tribal-class destroyers (1936) of the Royal Navy
Ships built on the River Tyne
1937 ships
World War II destroyers of the United Kingdom
Ships sunk by German submarines in World War II
World War II shipwrecks in the Atlantic Ocean
Maritime incidents in October 1941
Ships built by Vickers Armstrong